I Just Feel So "Sweet" is the first and only studio album by Japanese pop band Sweet Velvet. It was released on February 26, 2000, through Giza Studio.

Background

Three tracks out of ten: "So good", "Sweeter Baby" and "Fairplay" were reprised from indies album "Sweet Velvet". Fairplay has subtitle -album mix- and it shares significant melody change.

Most of the tracks were previously released as b-side of their singles, with exception of Un jour, Blue and Drive and Over which were recorded newly for this album.

Two tracks out of ten were composed by band themselves while seven tracks out of ten were composed by Japanese composer Aika Ohno.

After the album release, the band has disbanded without official announcement and later their website was removed by director of Giza Studio as well.

Charting
The album charted at #100 on the Oricon charts in its first week. It charted for 1 week and sold 2,900 copies.

Track listing

Personnel
Credits adapted from the CD booklet of I Just Feel So "Sweet".

Mizuki Akimoto - vocalist, lyricist
Shinichi Inoue - guitarist
Ryousuke Shimizu - drummer
Naoyuki Tsukada - composing, synthesizer, chorus,
Aika Ohno - composing, chorus
Nami Kaneko - composing
Hirohito Furui (Garnet Crow) - arranging
Yasuharu Konishi - arranging
Kuuron Oshiro - arranging
Ryo Kamomiya - arranging

Yoshinobu Ohga (nothin' but love) - guitarist
Makoto Miyoshi (Rumania Montevideo) - guitarist
Makoto Kimura - drummer
Akio Nakajima - recording, mixing
Yuji Sugiyama - recording, mixing
Katsuyuki Yoshimatsu - assistant engineering
Chihiro Hayashi - directing
Yuko Sakamoto - directing
Gan Kojima – art direction
Rockaku - producing

In media
I Just Feel So Love Again - ending theme for anime television series Mamotte Shugogetten
Flame Of Love - ending theme for anime television series Monster Rancher
Lazy Drive - ending theme for TV Asahi program Yajiuma Wide

References

2000 albums
Being Inc. albums
Japanese-language albums
Giza Studio albums
Albums produced by Daiko Nagato